Richard Herrera, a.k.a. Rich Herrera, is a television actor/host and former MTV VJ. Herrera along with Richard Hardin, representing the Philippines, won The Amazing Race Asia 4 in 2010. He joined MTV Asia in 2011 as a MTV VJ, hosting Pimp My Ride Malaysia. Herrera along with Hardin provided voiceovers for The Price Is Right on ABS-CBN in 2011.

Filmography

Movies

See also
The Amazing Race Asia
Pimp My Ride

References

External links
Pimp My Ride Malaysia: Meet the Team on YouTube

Filipino television presenters
Filipino male voice actors
The Amazing Race contestants
Year of birth missing (living people)
Living people
Reality show winners